Clavering is a village and also a parish in north-west Essex in England. The name 'Clavering' means 'place where clover grows'.

Location and local area

Clavering is situated 20 miles (32 km) south of Cambridge on the River Stort, close to the border with Hertfordshire. It is one of over 100 villages in the district of Uttlesford. Local towns are Saffron Walden, which is just over six miles north-east of the village, and Bishop's Stortford, eight miles to the south. The closest railway stations are Newport and Audley End. Clavering is located 10 miles from Stansted Airport.

Today Clavering is a large and scattered village community that encompasses seven 'greens' and three 'ends', which are: Hill Green, Stickling Green, Starlings Green, Roast Green, Sheepcote Green, Birds Green, Deers Green, Mill End, Ford End and Further Ford End. It retains many old timber-framed and thatched buildings. The oldest remaining parts of medieval Clavering's village centre are located at Church End and Middle Street, close to the church and the river.

Village amenities

The village has a large playing field, called Jubilee Field, with bowls and tennis facilities and children's play area. Adjoining Simon's Wood provides access to many countryside walks. The area has several accessible fishing lakes, which attract keen anglers. These include Clavering Lakes – a series of five purpose-built lakes created in 1991. Clavering has a primary school and large village shop with the post office being on Stortford Road, and there is a long-established garden centre/nursery on Hill Green called FW Whyman.

Village clubs and societies include Clavering Players, an amateur drama company that began life in 1945 as Cheerio's Concert Party. Clavering Cricket Club plays on Hill Green and has done so since the turn of the 20th century. The pavilion was built in 1950 and features seating from Lord's, the home of English cricket.

Chef and TV presenter Jamie Oliver comes from and lived in Clavering until he sold his compound to Daisy Ridley in 2019. Jamie's parents Trevor and Sally ran one of the two village pubs, The Cricketers, from the 1970s until 2021. The Fox and Hounds is located at the other end of the village opposite the River Stort. Both the Fox and The Cricketers attract people from nearby villages such as Arkesden, Wicken Bonhunt and Langley Upper Green as well as Clavering residents.

Places of historic interest

Notable sites in Clavering include Clavering Castle and the former Clavering guildhall – now known as The Bury.  The remains of the castle are now just ringworks and earthworks. The castle is believed to date from pre-Norman times. The former guildhall is a medieval Grade II* listed building. Constructed in the early 14th century, it was restored following a fire in December 1991.

The parish Church of St Mary & St Clement is largely 15th century but contains some hallmarks from a pre-medieval church that stood on the site. Notable objects include the carved Elizabethan pulpit and stained glass. There is a memorial in the church to Mary Wales, whose brother Charles Green and husband William Wales sailed on Captain James Cook's first and second voyages.

Two other church buildings stand in Clavering. There is a brick built Primitive Methodist chapel (now a private home), dating from 1877 to 1878 on Hill Green. Clavering Christian Centre, now an ecumenical church/community centre, is on Stortford Road in a building that originally housed a Congregational church.

The Moat Farm Murder and 'Sally Arsenic'

Two notorious murder cases are part of the village's history. The Moat Farm Murder in 1903 attracted scores of sightseers after the body of Camille Cecile Holland was dug up in the grounds of Moat Farm, the place of residence she had acquired whilst presenting herself as the wife of Samuel Herbert Dougal. Dougal was actually married to another woman by the name of Sarah (née Sarah Henrietta White) who, once Miss Holland had been disposed of, took up residence at the Moat Farm pretending, initially at least, to be Dougal's daughter. This pretence nevertheless was soon dropped when she started wearing clothes known to have been the property of Miss Holland. Samuel Herbert Dougal was hanged for the crime yet Sarah escaped all scrutiny and disappeared from all records from that time onward.

Some 50 years earlier Sarah Chesham (known locally as 'Sally Arsenic') was hanged for the attempted murder of her husband. Previously she had been tried and acquitted for the murder of her two sons and the illegitimate son of a neighbour and this "bad character" led to the police and coroner disregarding the initial inquest's findings that there was insufficient evidence to bring the case to trial. Unlike the previous three trials, Sarah did not have legal counsel in this final trial and was left to defend herself from the dubious account put forward by an old friend she had fallen out with (a friend who was also dubbed Sally Arsenic!), the assertions of a well respected expert, who himself had admitted in a letter that the amount of arsenic present in Richard's body was not enough to bring a case to trial, and a jury influenced by sensationalised media coverage that had persisted since the original three trials. Unsurprisingly, the illiterate wife of a farm labourer was unable to convince the jury of her innocence. However, in 2019 the conviction was deemed unsafe on the BBC TV show Murder Mystery in my Family, during which programme, even the barrister acting for the prosecution advised the judge that Sarah should not have been found guilty.

Of course this was not known at the time and this case influenced a change in the law on selling arsenic – requiring vendors to make a note of the purchaser's name, address and reason for needing poison.

Governance

An electoral ward in the same name exists. This ward had a population of 1,461 at the 2011 Census.

It is located in the local government district of Uttlesford and within the Saffron Walden (UK Parliament constituency).

Notable people

Jamie Oliver, celebrity chef (formerly of the village)

Gallery

See also
Clavering hundred
The Hundred Parishes

References

External links

Clavering village website

 
Villages in Essex
Civil parishes in Essex
Uttlesford